Bilel Slimani (born 28 April 1989) is an Algerian football player. He currently plays for Paradou AC in the Algerian Ligue Professionnelle 2.

References

External links
 

1989 births
Living people
Algerian footballers
Algeria under-23 international footballers
MC Alger players
Algerian Ligue Professionnelle 1 players
Association football goalkeepers
21st-century Algerian people